Miss World 2023 will be the 71st edition of the Miss World pageant, to be held in the United Arab Emirates in 2023, marking the first edition to stage the final in the Middle East. Karolina Bielawska of Poland will crown her successor at the end of the event.

Background

Location and date 
On 13 February 2023, Julia Morley, chairperson of the Miss World Organization, announced that the competition will take place in the United Arab Emirates in 2023. "Further details to follow," Morley added, referring to the final date and the venue of the pageant.

Selection of participants 
Contestants from 87 countries and territories were selected to compete in the competition. One of them is a designee after the withdrawal of the original contestant.

Poelano Mothisi, the first runner-up in Miss Lesotho 2021, was appointed to represent her country as the original winner Refiloe Lefothane pursued to continue her studies abroad.

The 2023 edition will see the returns of Aruba, Australia, Bangladesh, Barbados, Belarus, the British Virgin Islands, Croatia, Ethiopia, Georgia, Greece, Guatemala, Guyana, Kazakhstan, Laos, Lebanon, Lesotho, Liberia, Montenegro, Morocco, Myanmar, New Zealand, Romania, South Sudan, Suriname, Thailand, and Zambia. Morocco last competed in 1968, Suriname last competed in 2012, Liberia and Romania last competed in 2017, Lebanon, Lesotho, and Zambia last competed in 2018, while the others last competed in 2019.

Contestants
As of 19 March 2023, 87 contestants have been confirmed:

Upcoming pageants

Notes

References

External links 

Miss World
2023 beauty pageants